Velchevo is a village in Apriltsi Municipality, Lovech Province, northern Bulgaria.

References

Villages in Lovech Province